Edward James Beach (born 14 November 2003) is a Welsh professional footballer who plays as a goalkeeper for Chelmsford City, on loan from Chelsea.

Club career
Beach started his footballing career as a striker for his local Sunday league teams, Milford Youth and the New Forest Football Academy. At the age of fifteen, his father sent him a Twitter link regarding an open trial exclusively for goalkeepers, and he decided to attend. He was repeatedly invited back, having impressed, and was eventually offered a further trial at professional side Bournemouth. Having only attended the trial for three of the eight weeks, Beach returned to Sunday league level, scoring a hat-trick for his local side. 

Fellow professional side Southampton also showed an interest in Beach, and sent scouts to watch him play for his local team in a Hampshire Cup game. He was playing in midfield in the game, with his dad telling scouts that Beach "wasn't a goalkeeper" when asked why. Despite this, he was still invited for an eight-week trial, and as with the Bournemouth trial, this was also cut short. However, unlike the Bournemouth trial, Southampton had offered Beach a place in the academy, and he joined at under-15 level.

He suffered an eleven-month long injury during his first couple of years with Southampton, returning in early 2020, just before the COVID-19 pandemic in the United Kingdom forced football to stop temporarily. He managed to impress during the time he spent in the academy, and signed a scholarship deal with Southampton in August 2020.

Beach's performances in Southampton's 2021–22 campaign, in which they won the Premier League South title and came second nationally to Manchester City, attracted the attention of Chelsea, and he made the move to West London in July 2022.

In January 2023, Beach was loaned to National League South side Chelmsford City.

International career
Born in England, Beach is eligible to represent England and Wales at international level. He has represented Wales at under-19 level.

Career statistics

Club

References

2003 births
Living people
English people of Welsh descent
English footballers
Welsh footballers
Wales youth international footballers
Association football goalkeepers
National League (English football) players
Southampton F.C. players
Chelsea F.C. players
Chelmsford City F.C. players